Elia Soriano (born 26 June 1989) is an Italian-German professional footballer who most recently played as a striker for Kickers Offenbach. He is the older brother of Roberto Soriano.

References

External links
 
 
 

1989 births
Living people
Sportspeople from Darmstadt
Footballers from Hesse
German people of Italian descent
Association football forwards
German footballers
Italian footballers
German expatriate footballers
SV Darmstadt 98 players
VfR Aalen players
Eintracht Frankfurt II players
Karlsruher SC players
Stuttgarter Kickers players
Würzburger Kickers players
Korona Kielce players
VVV-Venlo players
Hapoel Ra'anana A.F.C. players
Kickers Offenbach players
Regionalliga players
3. Liga players
2. Bundesliga players
Ekstraklasa players
Eredivisie players
Israeli Premier League players
German expatriate sportspeople in Poland
Expatriate footballers in Poland
German expatriate sportspeople in the Netherlands
Expatriate footballers in the Netherlands
German expatriate sportspeople in Israel
Expatriate footballers in Israel